Inna Sekirov is a medical microbiologist and a physician scientist. Sekirov is the Program Head for TB/Mycobacteriology at the British Columbia Centre for Disease Control, and a Clinical Assistant Professor of Pathology and Laboratory Medicine at the University of British Columbia in Vancouver, British Columbia, Canada. Sekirov obtained her PhD, MD, and FRCPC at University of British Columbia, carrying out her PhD work at the Brett Finlay lab. Her research focuses on the public health-related aspects of medical microbiology, clinical applications of microbial genomics and TB/mycobacteriology diagnostic methods.

She has also led COVID-19 research projects on ACEII, antibody responses, and seroprevalence using dried blood spots.

References

Microbiologists
Academic staff of the University of British Columbia
Living people
Year of birth missing (living people)